The American Music Award for Favorite Country New Artist is a major music industry award that was created in 1989. However, the award was discontinued after 2003.

Years reflect the year in which the American Music Awards were presented, for works released in the previous year.

Winners and nominees

1980s

1990s

2000s

References

American Music Awards
Country music awards
Music awards for breakthrough artist
Awards established in 1989
1989 establishments in the United States
Awards disestablished in 2003
2003 disestablishments in the United States